Rufinus I (died 293) was Bishop of Byzantium from 284 to 293.

293 deaths
Year of birth unknown
Bishops of Byzantium
3rd-century Romans